His Majesty's Prison Belmarsh is a Category-A men's prison in Thamesmead, south-east London, England. The prison is used in high-profile cases, particularly those concerning national security. Within the prison grounds is the High Security Unit (HSU); this has 48 single cells and is regarded as the most secure prison unit in the United Kingdom. It is run by His Majesty's Prison Service.

History
Belmarsh Prison was built on part of the East site of the former Royal Arsenal in Woolwich, and became operational on 2 April 1991. It is adjacent to and adjoins Woolwich Crown Court.

Between 2001 and 2002, Belmarsh Prison was used to detain a number of people indefinitely without charge or trial under the provisions of the Part 4 of the Anti-terrorism, Crime and Security Act 2001, leading it to be called the "British version of Guantanamo Bay". The law lords later ruled in A v Secretary of State for the Home Dept that such imprisonment was discriminatory and against the Human Rights Act.

It is often used for the detention of prisoners for terrorist related offences.  In September 2006, the number of such prisoners was 51.

In May 2007, there was a violent disturbance in the prison, Sky News reported. At least four prison officers were injured.

In 2009, an archaeological dig on site led to the discovery of a 6,000-year-old trackway in the prison, the second oldest known wooden trackway in Northern Europe after the Sweet Track near Glastonbury.

In November 2009, an inspection report from the Chief Inspector of Prisons criticised the "extremely high" amount of force used to control inmates at the prison. The report also stated that an unusually high number of prisoners had reported being intimidated or victimised by staff at Belmarsh.

In 2010, HMP Isis Young Offenders Institution was opened within the perimeter wall of Belmarsh Prison.

The prison today

Belmarsh is a Category A Prison holding prisoners from all over the United Kingdom. In addition, Belmarsh is a local prison accepting different categories of prisoners from primarily the Central Criminal Court (Old Bailey) and Magistrates' Courts in South East London. It also serves Crown and Magistrates' Courts in South West Essex. Accommodation at the prison is a mixture of approximately 60% multi-occupancy cells and 40% single cells, distributed mainly across four residential units.

Inmates at Belmarsh are offered access to education, workshops and two gyms. One gym focuses on physical education courses and the other gym focuses on recreation, with use of a sports hall and a fitness room. The gym staff have a partnership with Charlton Athletic F.C. to deliver FA accredited coaching courses for prisoners.

A listener scheme for prisoners at risk from suicide or self-harm is in operation at Belmarsh. There is also a support group for foreign national prisoners, providing advice on immigration law.

Notable inmates

Current inmates
Michael Adebolajo, man who murdered British soldier Lee Rigby
Ali Harbi Ali, murdered MP David Amess
Julian Assange, accused by the United States of espionage. Held here since 2019 and could be extradited to the US.
Paul 'Des' Ballard, television presenter, caused death by dangerous driving, and various other crimes including rape
David Copeland, neo-Nazi who bombed a gay pub, Brixton Market and Brick Lane
Delroy Grant, the "Night Stalker", a serial rapist and burglar, with perhaps over 100 offences
Danyal Hussein, murdered two sisters in a London park
Stephen Port, the "Grindr Killer", multiple rapist, murderer of four men
Khairi Saadallah, stabbed three people to death in a Reading park, seriously injured others

Former inmates
Hashem Abedi (moved to HM Prison Frankland)
 Michael Adebowale (moved to Broadmoor Hospital)
Abu Hamza al-Masri (sentenced to life imprisonment in the United States. Incarcerated at ADX Florence)
Sudesh Amman
Jeffrey Archer
Ronnie Biggs
Charles Bronson
Anjem Choudary 
Richard Huckle (later moved to HM Prison Full Sutton, where he was murdered)
Ian Huntley (moved to HM Prison Frankland in 2008)
Usman Khan
Denis MacShane
Thomas Mair (moved to HM Prison Frankland)
Darren Osborne, murdered one person and attempted murder of others by driving into them (moved to HM Prison Full Sutton)
Maurice Robinson (moved to HM Prison Lowdham Grange)
Tommy Robinson
Richard Tomlinson
John Worboys (moved to HM Prison Wakefield)
Wayne Couzens (moved to HM Prison Frankland)
Jonathan Aitken

References

External links
 Ministry of Justice pages on HMP Belmarsh
 HMP Belmarsh – HM Inspectorate of Prisons Reports

 
Men's prisons
1991 establishments in England